Premenstrual water retention (or premenstrual fluid retention) is felt by some women before the onset menstruation. No evidence supports actual water or sodium retention however. Even though the phenomenon does not appear to be correlated to serum levels of progesterone or estradiol according to actual data, it is thought to be caused by high levels of circulating progesterone, estrogen, and prolactin, which stimulate secretory cells in the body. In the breasts, increased blood flow may be involved. A sensation of water retention and breast swelling may also be caused by hormonal contraceptives (which contain estrogen and a progestogen).

See also
 Prolactin
 Edema
 Menstrual cycle
 Water retention (medicine)
 Mammoplasia

References

Breast
Menstrual cycle